The Best Kept Secret is the ninth solo album by dobro player Jerry Douglas, released in 2005 (see 2005 in music).

Guest musicians include Alison Krauss, Sam Bush, John Fogerty, Bill Frisell, Béla Fleck and Jeff Coffin.

Track listing
All songs by Jerry Douglas unless otherwise noted.
 "She Makes Me Want to Sing" (Jerry Douglas, Derek Trucks) – 5:53
 "Who's Your Uncle?" – 3:28
 "Back in Love Again" (Zane Grey, Len Ron Hanks) – 3:56
 "A Remark You Made" (Joe Zawinul) – 4:38
 "The Best Kept Secret" – 9:30
 "Lil' Roro" – 5:20
 "Swing Blues No. 1" (Bob Wills) – 3:34
 "Snow's First Fall" (Gabe Witcher) – 4:35
 "Ya Ya etc." – 4:52
 "U R My Flower" – 1:13
 "Sir Aly B" – 5:03

Personnel
Jerry Douglas – dobro, lap steel guitar, vocals
Sam Bush – mandolin
Derek Trucks – slide guitar
Alison Krauss – vocals
Jeff Coffin – saxophone
Béla Fleck – banjo
John Fogerty – vocals, guitar
Viktor Krauss – banjo
Derek Jones – bass
Bill Frisell – guitar
Keith Sewell – guitar
John Deaderick – Wurlitzer
Gabe Witcher – violin, Hammond organ
Jim White – drums
Shannon Forrest – drums, percussion

Production notes:
Jerry Douglas – producer
Avi Kipper – engineer
Jim DeMain – mastering
Jason Lehning– engineer, mixing

2005 albums
Jerry Douglas albums
El Music albums